Granito (Granite) is a city  in the state of Pernambuco, Brazil.

Geography

 State - Pernambuco
 Region - Sertão Pernambucano
 Boundaries - Exu and Moreilândia    (N);  Parnamirim    (S);  Serrita   (E);   Bodocó   (W).
 Area - 521.86 km²
 Elevation - 447 m
 Hydrography - Brigida River
 Vegetation - Caatinga
 Climate - semi arid - (Sertão) hot
 Annual average temperature - 25.4 c
 Distance to Recife - 592 km

Economy

The main economic activities in Granito are based in agribusiness, especially creation of cattle, sheep,  goats, donkeys, chickens;  and plantations of corn.

Economic Indicators

Economy by Sector
2006

Health Indicators

References

Municipalities in Pernambuco